Osinovo is the name of several rural localities in Russia:
Osinovo, Arkhangelsk Oblast, a village in Vinogradovsky District, Arkhangelsk Oblast
Osinovo, Perm Krai, a village in Beryozovsky District, Perm Krai